William Upham (1792–1853) was a U.S. Senator from Vermont from 1843 to 1853. Senator Upham may also refer to:

Alonzo S. Upham (1811–1882), New York State Senate
Charles Wentworth Upham (1802–1875), Massachusetts State Senate
George B. Upham (1768–1848), New Hampshire State Senate